La Leona was an Argentine telenovela produced by El Árbol by Pablo Echarri and Martín Seefeld in association with Telefe Contenidos. Its first broadcast was on January 18, 2016 and its last broadcast on July 14, 2016 after 116 chapters. It was transmitted from Monday to Friday at 11:45 pm on the screen of Telefe. It was starred by Nancy Dupláa and Pablo Echarri and the antagonistic participations of Miguel Ángel Solá, Esther Goris, Marco Antonio Caponi , Ludovico Di Santo, Juan Gil Navarro, Dolores Fonzi, Martín Seefeld, Juan Pedro Lanzani and Mónica Antonópulos. The program featured the stellar performances of Susú Pecoraro, Patricia Palmer, Andrea Pietra, Lito Cruz, Paula Cancio, Julia Calvo, Diego Alonso Gómez, Nico García, Alfredo Castellani and the special participation of Hugo Arana. It also has the youth participation of Antonia Bengoechea, Joaquín Flamini and Azul Fernández and the debut of Andrea Rincón as an actress on television. The Television Series won the 2017 Martín Fierro for Best Daily Fiction.

Plot 
It is based on a textile factory about to break where María Leone (Nancy Dupláa) will play a fundamental role, defending the rights of the employees of this factory owned by the Miller family.

Cast 
 Nancy Dupláa as María "La Leona" Leone 
 Pablo Echarri as Franco Uribe/Diego Miller Liberman
 Marco Antonio Caponi as Rodrigo Cáceres
 Ludovico Di Santo as Alex Arizmendi
 Miguel Ángel Solá as Klaus Miller 
 Diego Alonso Gómez as Fabián Suárez
 Susú Pecoraro as Sofía Uribe/Sarah Liberman
 Esther Goris as Diana Liberman 
 Juan Pedro Lanzani as Brian Miller Liberman 
 Hugo Arana as Pedro Salvador Leone 
 Juan Gil Navarro as Gabriel Miller Liberman 
 Patricia Palmer as Isabella Medeiros
 Dolores Fonzi as Eugenia Leone
 Martín Seefeld as Coco Zanneti
 Andrea Pietra as Estela Castro
 Lito Cruz as Homero Stronatti
 Pepe Soriano as Samuel Liberman
 Mónica Antonópulos as Julieta "July" Irigoyen 
 Julia Calvo as Beatriz "Betty" Pardo
 Alfredo Castellani as Bernardo García
 Antonia Bengoechea as Abril Uribe Pécora/Abril Miller Pécora
 Paula Cancio as Nurith Torres 
 Nico García as Charly Leone 
 Joaquín Flamini as Facundo Leone/Suárez
 Azul Fernández as Paola Zanneti
 Andrea Rincón as Carla Fiorito
 Natalia Figueiras as Pía Bebilacua
 María Dupláa as Vera Ortíz
 Delfina Chaves as Ruth Liberman
 Alejandra Darín as Esther Liberman
 Nahuel Mutti as Canevaro
 Ricardo Larrama as Jacinto
 Gastón Biagioni as Luna
 Horacio Roca as Kepler
 Martín Gross as Polaco
 Mario Moscoso as Benítez 
 Sandra Villani as Arrollo
 Liliana López Foresi as Carmen
 Malena Narvay as Young María Leone 
 Lucas Escariz as Young Klaus Miller 
 Bárbara Strauss as Young Diana Liberman 
 Delfina Chaves as Young Sarah Liberman 
 Fabián Fiori as Commissioner Marquez
 Gustavo De Filpo as journalist

Awards
 47th Martín Fierro Awards
 Best daily fiction
 Best lead actress in daily drama (Nancy Dupláa)
 Best secondary actor (Miguel Ángel Solá)
 Best new actor (Andrea Rincón)

Nominations
 47th Martín Fierro Awards
 Best lead actor of daily drama (Pablo Echarri)
 Best secondary actress (Mónica Antonópulos)
 Best new actor (Paula Cancio)
 Best writer (Pablo Lago and Susana Cardozo)
 Best opening theme ("María María" by Miss Bolivia)

References

2016 telenovelas
Telefe telenovelas
Spanish-language telenovelas
2016 Argentine television series debuts
2016 Argentine television series endings